Harlington Halt was a small railway station on the Dearne Valley Railway (DVR) located close by Harlington village, near Mexborough, South Yorkshire, England.

The station, which was located between Denaby station and Goldthorpe and Thurnscoe Halt, opened on 3 June 1912. At first, trains were operated on behalf of the DVR by the Lancashire and Yorkshire Railway; when that company amalgamated with the London and North Western Railway on 1 January 1922, the combined organisation (also known as the London and North Western Railway) absorbed the DVR on the same day.

The station closed on 10 September 1951.

References

Further reading
Railways of South Yorkshire, C.T.Goode, Dalesman Publishing. 

Disused railway stations in Doncaster
Former Dearne Valley Railway stations
Railway stations in Great Britain opened in 1912
Railway stations in Great Britain closed in 1951
1912 establishments in England